César "Pupy" Pedroso (born César de las Mercedes Pedroso Fernández; 24 September 1946 – 17 July 2022) was a Cuban pianist who became famous with Orquesta Revé and then as a founding member of Los Van Van. For many years, Pedroso wrote some of Van Van's most important songs such as "Calla Calla", "Tranquilo, Mota", "Seis Semanas", "El buenagente" and many others. In 2001 he founded his own band Pupy y Los que Son, Son. In 2006, he recorded four albums with his band.

Musicians 
 César "Pupy" Pedroso/ MUSICAL DIRECTOR AND PIANO ---
 José Gómez Martínez / LEAD VOCALS ---
 Armando Cantero Abreu / LEAD VOCALS  ---
 Alexander Luis Lara Dedieu / LEAD VOCALS ---
 Geraldo Miró Rivera / VIOLÍN ---
 Osiris Martínez Rodríguez / KEYBOARD ---
 Reinier Elizarde Ruanio / BASS ---
 Jose Luis Quintana Fuerte / PAD ---
 Roelvis Reyes Simono / DRUMS ---
 René Suárez Zapata / TIMBALES ---
 Julio Noroña Pérez / GÜIRO ---
 Jorge Castillo Hernández / CONGAS ---
 Leonardo Tereuel Velásquez / TRUMPET ---
 Juan Carlos Gonzales Borrero / TRUMPET ---
 Sergio R Luna Longchamp / TROMBONE ---
 Neuris Lorenzo Mustelier / TROMBONE ---

References

External links 

 
 
 

1946 births
2022 deaths
Cuban songwriters
Male songwriters
Cuban pianists
Male pianists
21st-century pianists
21st-century male musicians